GTA Motor Competición is a Spanish racing team based in Torrent, Valencia, Spain.

History
They have competed in many series including Superleague Formula and European F3 Open Championship. Many top drivers have driven for the team including former Formula One driver Jaime Alguersuari.

For the 2008 Superleague Formula season the team operated the Sevilla FC and Tottenham Hotspur. They won 1 race in the 2008 Donington Park Superleague Formula round with driver Borja García in the Sevilla car.

Its founder, Domingo Ochoa, has also founded GTA Motor, a company which designs and builds street-legal sports cars. Their first model is the GTA Spano.

Results

Superleague Formula

References

External links
GTA Motor Official website

Spanish auto racing teams
Euroformula Open Championship teams
International GT Open teams
Superleague Formula teams
Auto racing teams established in 1994